The broadcast of the fifth season began on 16 September 2011. The judges were Dieter Bohlen, Sylvie van der Vaart and Motsi Mabuse. It was hosted by Daniel Hartwich and Marco Schreyl. Like the years before, television presenter Nina Moghaddam shows what goes behind the scenes of the show. 

The panpipe-player, Leo Rojas, won the competition and €100 000.

Casting
The casting for this season began on 1 May 2011 in Hamburg. Also, Dresden, Essen, Mainz, Wiesbaden, Munich, Berlin, Erfurt, Karlsruhe, Vienna and Cologne.

Semi-finals

Semi-final 1

Semi-final 2

Finals

References 

Das Supertalent
2011 German television seasons